Phyllostachys iridescens  is a species of bamboo found in Anhui, Jiangsu, Zhejiang provinces of China.

References

External links
 
 

iridescens
Flora of China